ANTARES is the name of a neutrino detector residing 2.5 km under the Mediterranean Sea off the coast of Toulon, France. It is designed to be used as a directional neutrino telescope to locate and observe neutrino flux from cosmic origins in the direction of the Southern Hemisphere of the Earth, a complement to the South Pole neutrino detector IceCube that detects neutrinos from both hemispheres. The name comes from Astronomy with a Neutrino Telescope and Abyss environmental RESearch project; the acronym is also the name of the prominent star Antares. The experiment is a recognized CERN experiment (RE6). Other neutrino telescopes designed for use in the nearby area include the Greek NESTOR telescope and the Italian NEMO telescope, which are both in early design stages. The data taking of ANTARES was finished in February 2022, after 16 years of continuous operation.

Design
The array contains a set of twelve separate vertical strings of photomultiplier tubes.  Each one has 75 optical modules and is about 350 meters long. They are anchored at the bottom of the sea at a depth of about 2.5 km, roughly 70 meters apart from each other.  When neutrinos enter the southern hemisphere of the earth, they usually continue traveling directly through it. On rare occasions, a few muon neutrinos interact with the water in the Mediterranean Sea.  When this happens, they produce a high energy muon.  ANTARES works by its photomultiplier tubes detecting the Cherenkov radiation emitted as the muon passes through the water. The detection techniques used discriminate between the signature of "upward-going muons", a muon neutrino that has had interactions with matter below the detector (the Earth), and much higher flux of "downward atmospheric muons".

In contrast to the South Pole neutrino telescopes AMANDA and IceCube, ANTARES uses water instead of ice as its Cherenkov medium.  As light in water is less scattered than in ice this results in a better resolving power. On the other hand, water contains more sources of background light than ice (radioactive isotopes potassium-40 in the sea salt and bioluminescent organisms), leading to a higher energy thresholds for ANTARES with respect to IceCube and making more sophisticated background-suppression methods necessary.

Construction history
The construction of ANTARES was completed on May 30, 2008, two years after the first string was deployed.
Initial testing began in 2000. Equipment indirectly related to the detector such as a seismometer were deployed in 2005. The first string of photomultiplier tubes was moved into place in February 2006. In September 2006 the second line was successfully connected. Lines 3, 4 and 5 were deployed at the end of 2006 and connected in January 2007. This was an important step that made Antares the biggest neutrino telescope in the Northern hemisphere (surpassing the Baikal neutrino telescope). Lines 6, 7, 8, 9, and 10 were deployed between March and early November 2007 and connected in December 2007 and January 2008. From May 2008 the detector has been running in its complete 12-line configuration.

Deployment and connection of the detector are performed in cooperation with the French oceanographic institute, IFREMER, currently using the ROV Victor, and for some past operations the submarine Nautile.

Experimental goals
The ANTARES project complements the IceCube Neutrino Observatory in Antarctica.  The detection principles of the two projects are very similar, although ANTARES only points toward the Southern Hemisphere. Thanks to its location in the Mediterranean Sea, ANTARES is more sensitive to neutrinos with energies below 100 TeV in the southern sky, a region that includes many galactic sources. ANTARES will detect neutrinos from high energy origin, particularly in the range from 1010 to 1014 electronvolts (10 GeV - 100 TeV). Over many years of operation, it may be able to produce a map of the neutrino flux from cosmic origins in the Southern Hemisphere. Of particular interest would be the detection of astrophysical point sources of neutrinos, possibly in correlation with observations in other bands (such as gamma rays sources observed by the HESS telescope in Namibia, which has a common field of view with ANTARES).

Apart from this astro-particle physics aspect, the ANTARES telescope may also tackle some fundamental problems in particle physics, such as the search for dark matter in the form of neutralino annihilation in the Sun (normal solar neutrinos being outside the energy range of ANTARES) or the Galactic Center. Due to the very different methods employed, its expected sensitivity is complementary to the direct dark matter searches performed by various experiments such as DAMA, CDMS and at the LHC. Detection of neutralino signals would also confirm supersymmetry, but is not generally considered very likely at the ANTARES sensitivity level. Other possible "exotic" phenomena that could conceivably be measured by ANTARES include nuclearites or magnetic monopoles.

Results
The first neutrino detections were reported in Feb 2007.

Using 6 years of data, a search of the galactic center for point sources of neutrinos found none.  Atmospheric neutrino oscillations were also measured.

Additional instrumentation
In addition to the main optical detector for cosmic neutrinos, the ANTARES experiment also houses a number of instruments for the study of the deep sea environment, such as salinity and oxygen probes, sea current profilers and instrumentation for the measurement of light transmission and sound velocity. Also, a camera system has been installed for automatic tracking of bioluminescent organisms. Results from these instruments, while also important for the calibration of the detector, will be shared with ocean science institutes involved in the ANTARES collaboration. While the ANTARES detector contains an acoustic positioning system for the alignment of the free-floating detector lines, it also houses a separate dedicated acoustic detection system AMADEUS, which will comprise 6 converted ANTARES storeys with hydrophones to evaluate the possibility for acoustic detection of neutrinos in the deep sea. The first 3 of these acoustic storeys have been included in the instrumentation line, the other 3 on the 12th line.

See also 

 P-ONE

References

External links
 ANTARES home
 IFREMER homepage
 KM3NeT neutrino telescope
Record for ANTARES on INSPIRE-HEP

Mediterranean Sea
Neutrino observatories
Particle experiments
CERN experiments